Ascott Earl is a village in Oxfordshire, England. There are the remains of a motte-and-bailey castle beside the river Evenlode.

External links

Villages in Oxfordshire
West Oxfordshire District